Mount Olympus in the U.S. state of Utah is one of the most prominent and recognizable mountains viewable from practically every location in the Salt Lake Valley. Mount Olympus is not the tallest peak along the Wasatch Front, but its unusual form and location make it a popular hiking destination for locals. The mountain is situated immediately east of the center of the Salt Lake Valley (due east from Murray and Taylorsville).

Hiking
Because of its proximity, visibility, and accessibility to a large metropolitan area, Mount Olympus has been a popular hiking destination for the residents of the Salt Lake Valley for many years. The last 600 vertical feet of terrain to the summit involves several short semi-technical scrambles that often cause problems for hikers, especially on the descent and have led to numerous rescues. 

This peak is also a popular winter hiking route because the terrain is not as avalanche prone as many of the surrounding peaks. Due to the trail's elevation and tree density, it remains snow-covered until May, and early spring hiking is best aided by snowshoes. Hiding near the base of Mount Olympus lies Utah's second deepest, and the United States' 13th deepest cave, known as Neffs Cave.

See also
 List of Mountains in Utah
 Wasatch-Cache National Forest

References

External links 

 
 
 
 

Mountains of Utah
Mountains of Salt Lake County, Utah
Wasatch-Cache National Forest
Wasatch Range